Eumerus sogdianus is a species of Hoverfly, from the family Syrphidae, in the order Diptera.

References

Diptera of Europe
Eristalinae
Insects described in 1952